Fostedil (A-53,986, KB-944) is a vasodilator acting as a calcium channel blocker which was under development for the treatment of heart conditions such as angina pectoris but was never marketed. It has antihypertensive and antiarrhythmic effects.

Synthesis 

Treatment of benzanilide with phosphorus pentasulfide or Lawesson's reagent gives thioamide.
Oxidative ring formation by reaction with potassium ferricyanide and base (presumably involving a free radical intermediate) constructs the benzothiazole ring.
Bromination of this compound with N-bromosuccinimide produces bromomethyl intermediate.
The synthesis of fostedil concludes with a Michaelis-Arbuzov reaction with triethyl phosphite.

See also 
Ibrolipim
 Calcium channel blocker

References 

Benzothiazoles
Phosphonate esters